Alain Émile Louis Marie Poher (17 April 1909 – 9 December 1996) was a French politician who briefly served as President of France twice, in 1969 and 1974. He held the office ad interim as President of the Senate following the resignation of Charles de Gaulle and the death of Georges Pompidou. Poher was affiliated with the Popular Republican Movement (MRP) until 1966 and later with the Democratic Centre (CD) and Centre of Social Democrats (CSD), which he joined in 1976.

A native of Ablon-sur-Seine south of Paris, Poher was a long-time member the Senate (1946–1948; 1952–1995), where he sat first for Seine-et-Oise until 1968 and then Val-de-Marne. He also served as President of the European Parliament from 1966 to 1969. As President of the Senate from 1968 to 1992 and the sole unelected President of France under the Fifth Republic, Poher remains an influential figure of the politics of 20th-century France. A leading candidate in the 1969 presidential election, he was defeated by Pompidou in the second round.

Early career
Poher was born in Ablon-sur-Seine, current-day Val-de-Marne, to a family from Brittany.

He graduated from the Lycée Louis-le-Grand and the Lycée Saint-Louis in Paris and later studied law. On 19 August 1938 he married Henriette Tugler (1907–2004) in La Baule-Escoublac, with whom he had two daughters, Marie-Agnès (born 1940) and Marie-Thérèse (1944–2002).

His administrative career began in 1938, when he became a junior executive officer at the Ministry of Finance. In World War II, he was wounded in combat after being sent to the front lines to defend against the German invasion. Later, he became a member of the French Resistance against Nazi Germany.

In the aftermath of the Liberation of France, he served in several political positions prior to entering the Senate: chairman at the Ministry of Finance's Liberation Committee (from 20 July 1944); head of Social Services, Ministry of Finance (from 1 January 1945); and Mayor of Ablon-sur-Seine (from 18 May 1945).

He was also General Commissioner for German and Austrian Affairs (1948–1950); Secretary of State for the Budget in the second government of Prime Minister Robert Schuman and first government of Prime Minister Henri Queuille (1948); Secretary of State for the Armed Forces (Navy) in the government of Prime Minister Félix Gaillard (1957–1958); and president of the Association des maires de France or AMF (1974–1983).

A longtime ally and political protégé of Schuman, Poher was reelected to the Senate in 1952, where he remained for over 40 years, until 1995. As a Senator he continued to serve in government (as Secretary of State for the Armed Forces, tasked with the Navy, in the government of Prime Minister Félix Gaillard in the late 1950s), in addition to his duties as mayor of his home town, Ablon-sur-Seine. Like Schuman, he was known for strongly pro-European integration positions; he served as President of the European Parliament from 1966 to 1969.

President of the Senate

During his tenure, Poher served with the Gaullist government of Prime Minister Maurice Couve de Murville, Charles de Gaulle's close ally. Some even referred to this period as the first cohabitation. Despite sharp political differences, Poher was widely credited for model cooperation with the government.

Acting President of France
According to the order of succession established by the Constitution of the Fifth Republic, the President of the Senate assumes the nation's presidential powers and duties following the president's death or resignation; the officeholder thus becomes ad interim head of state until the next early presidential election.

Poher's first service as interim president came on 29 April 1969, when Charles de Gaulle resigned. Previously he was one of Charles de Gaulle's most notable political opponents and played a key role in the successful "no" campaign in the final referendum of his presidency.

During his interim presidency Poher continued to serve as Senate President. However, he resided during this time in the Élysée Palace as acting president.

Initially Poher tried to recruit General Marie-Pierre Kœnig as a candidate for the presidency and offered him his full support. Kœnig, however, declined to run, citing his poor health and stating that one general should not replace another general as the head of state. After Kœnig's refusal, Poher himself announced his candidacy.

Due to favourable polls he was viewed as the strongest opponent of Georges Pompidou and the only non-Gaullist candidate who had a real opportunity to win the election. The lack of a longstanding party machine nevertheless hurt his chances.

During his short term in office Poher's main task was overseeing the incoming election, in which he himself participated. However, during his tenure he took some major initiatives; notably, he fired longtime Charles de Gaulle confidant Jacques Foccart, a Secretary-General for African Affairs as well as, unofficially, the chief of the Gaullist secret services, who returned to the Élysée after Pompidou's election.

Poher also ordered the directors of France's state-controlled radio and television networks to keep public media politically neutral and refrain from acting in the interest of any particular party. His successors followed this precedent. He also ordered the redeployment of a large police force in Paris in the wake of the May 68 events.

His accomplishments helped Poher, previously largely unknown to the public, develop significant popularity during his interim presidency, despite his defeat in the election.

He served again as ad interim head of state in 1974 after Pompidou died in office. This time, however, he did not run for his own term and stepped down after Valéry Giscard d'Estaing was elected against François Mitterrand.

Political career

Interim President of the French Republic: 28 April – 20 June 1969, 2 April – 27 May 1974

Government functions
Secretary of State for the Budget: 5 September – 20 November 1948
Secretary of State for the Navy: 11 November 1957 – 14 May 1958

Electoral mandates

European Parliament

President of the European Parliament: 1966–1969

Senate

Senator for Seine-et-Oise, Val-de-Marne: 1946–1948, 1952–1995
President of the Senate of France: 1968–1992

Local

Mayor of Ablon-sur-Seine: 1945–1983

References 

|-

|-

|-

|-

1909 births
1996 deaths
Deaths in Paris
20th-century heads of state of France
Sciences Po alumni
Candidates for President of France
Democratic Centre (France) MEPs
Democratic Centre (France) politicians
French Roman Catholics
French Senators of the Fourth Republic
French Senators of the Fifth Republic
Lycée Louis-le-Grand alumni
Lycée Saint-Louis alumni
MEPs for France 1958–1979
People from Val-de-Marne
Popular Republican Movement politicians
Presidents of the European Parliament
Presidents of the Senate (France)
Grand Crosses with Star and Sash of the Order of Merit of the Federal Republic of Germany
Senators of Seine-et-Oise
Senators of Val-de-Marne
Mines Paris - PSL alumni